William Miller (31 March 1908 – 1974) was an English professional footballer who made four appearances in the Football League, three for Luton Town and one for Southport. He was also on the books of Bolton Wanderers and Stockport County, without appearing in the Football League, and also played for several non-League clubs in the Cheshire and Lancashire area. He played as a centre half. Miller was born in Stockport, Cheshire, in 1908 and died in 1974, aged about 66.

References

Footballers from Stockport
Place of death missing
English footballers
Association football defenders
Altrincham F.C. players
Bolton Wanderers F.C. players
Luton Town F.C. players
Runcorn F.C. Halton players
Stockport County F.C. players
Stalybridge Celtic F.C. players
Southport F.C. players
Macclesfield Town F.C. players
Lancaster City F.C. players
English Football League players
1908 births
1974 deaths
Date of death missing